Mannan exo-1,2-1,6-alpha-mannosidase (exo-1,2-1,6-alpha-mannosidase, 1,2-1,6-alpha-D-mannan D-mannohydrolase) is an enzyme with systematic name (1->2)-(1->6)-alpha-D-mannan D-mannohydrolase. This enzyme catalyses the following chemical reaction

 Hydrolysis of (1->2)-alpha-D- and (1->6)-alpha-D- linkages in yeast mannan, releasing D-mannose

Mannose residues alpha-D-1,3- bonded are released to lesser extent.

References

External links 
 

EC 3.2.1